Gary W. Lopez (born March 14, 1951) is an American scientist, filmmaker, author, entrepreneur, and fine art photographer, living in Monterey, California. He began writing and producing academic and documentary films in the early 1980’s focusing on science and nature topics. In 1991 he joined ocean explorer and filmmaker, Jacques Cousteau and his son, Jean-Michel Cousteau as a writer and producer. Lopez authored and edited science and nature book series that were available in school and public libraries across the United States and Europe. Lopez is the founder of two media development companies, Archipelago Productions in 1983 and The NROC Project in 2003. Lopez is a pioneer in the establishment of fine art astrophotography. His images have won awards in international photography competitions.

Early life

Lopez was born on March 14, 1951, in Antioch, California. From an early age he had an interest in both science and visual arts. He studied zoology at University of California, Davis, earning a BS in 1973, and went on to earn a Ph.D. in marine biology from Scripps Institution of Oceanography in La Jolla, California in 1981 where he also taught and did research. While in graduate school he became a screen writer for Encyclopædia Britannica Films in Chicago, Illinois. At Britannica he met documentary producer Bert Van Bork and spent three years (1986-1989) as his assistant learning filmmaking.

Lopez was a lecturer at the University of California, San Diego in the Earth Science Department from 1979-1982 (summers), SIO Marine Biology in 1982, and the Biology Department in 1983. He was also a visiting professor at the Center for Scientific Research and Higher Education in Ensenada, Baja California from 1981-1982. His scientific research resulted in several scientific publications.

Career

In 1983 Lopez founded Archipelago Productions, a media development company that designed and developed interactive video programs and multimedia applications for many of the largest U.S. publishers including educational publisher Harcourt, Prentice Hall, and Encyclopedia Britannica. Over a ten-year period, Lopez wrote and produced more than 40 academic and documentary films and the series for Encyclopædia Britannica Films, PBS, and BBC. He also authored two books, Sharks in 1991 and Air Pollution in 1992; and co-edited and co-wrote two juvenile book series, the Wonder Book Series, and the Creative Science Series from 1989 to 1992. Archipelago Productions was acquired by Harcourt in 1993.

Lopez’s films received critical acclaim, including nine CINE Golden Eagle Awards. In 1991 he was recruited by Jacques Cousteau and his son, Jean-Michel Cousteau, to produce a series of 108 short television spots entitled, Cousteau Moments.

After the acquisition of Archipelago Production, in 1997 Lopez was appointed CEO of NETg, a division of Harcourt. He led the organization to become one of largest technology-based corporate training companies in the world, serving many of the Fortune 500. NETg was acquired by Thomson Corporation in 2002 as part of the acquisition of Harcourt General.

In 2002, Lopez returned to filmmaking. He reunited with Jean-Michel Cousteau to create the documentary series entitled, Jean-Michel Cousteau Ocean Adventures for KQED (PBS). Lopez produced the inaugural episode of the series, Voyage to Kure, that was narrated by Pierce Brosnan, and was premiered at a special screening for the White House. President George W. Bush cited the film as his inspiration for the establishment of the Papahānaumokuākea Marine National Monument, a 583,000 square mile protected area that encompasses all ten islands and atolls of the Northwestern Hawaiian Islands. At the time it was the world’s largest marine protected area.

In 2003, Lopez founded the non-profit Monterey Institute for Technology and Education (MITE), the creator of the International Journal of Learning and Media (published by MIT Press), The NROC Project, and the Open Educational Resource (OER) websites, HippoCampus,
 and EdReady. MITE’s work is supported by the Bill & Melinda Gates Foundation, the Hewlett Foundation, and the MacArthur Foundation. The EdReady learning platform developed by NROC is used by millions of students and educators nationwide.

Lopez was a pioneer in the establishment of astrophotography as a category of fine art photography. His deep space images have won awards in fine art photography competitions, including First Place in both the 2020 and 2021 International Photography Awards (Nature/Astrophotography category).

See also
 List of University of California, San Diego people

References

External links

 
 Dr. Gary Lopez
 Gary Lopez Portfolio

1951 births
Photographers from California
People from Monterey, California
20th-century American photographers
21st-century American photographers
Astrophotographers
Fine art photographers
Living people